The Mayor of Tauranga is the head of the municipal government of Tauranga, New Zealand, and presides over the Tauranga City Council. There is currently no Mayor of Tauranga. On 9 February 2021, a Crown Commission appointed by the Minister of Local Government took over all of the council’s governance responsibilities, including the vacant position of Mayor. Tenby Powell resigned as Mayor in November 2020.

History

Tauranga was gazetted as a borough in 1882, and achieved sufficient population to become a city in 1963. The 1989 Local Body reforms saw the city become part of the Tauranga District, before the City of Tauranga was reproclaimed in 2004.

Elections for mayor were held annually from 1882 up to 1915, when terms become two years. In 1935 terms were made three years, the current system. The election used first-past-the-post voting up until the 2016 election, then changed to single transferable vote.

One of Tauranga's longest-serving mayors was Canon Charles Jordan, who was mayor for nine years in total over five separate periods. He is the subject of a commemorative statue, unveiled in Tauranga Domain in 1916, four years after his death.

The last mayor, Tenby Powell, was elected to the office in October 2019 but resigned in November 2020, eight months after he was unanimously censured by his council for an angry outburst. Following further mayoral "outbursts," Powell publicly called for the Minister of Local Government to appoint a commission to replace the "dysfunctional" council. The decision to cancel the election for a new mayor and councillors, and the appointment of a crown commission instead by Nanaia Mahuta was not without controversy. A legal opinion by law firm Russell McVeagh found her decision may have been "unlawful" and Tauranga MP Simon Bridges called the decision "dramatic and draconian", while saying that Powell quitting removed "a significant source of friction" and it was reasonable to assume the council would become more functional with the election of a new Mayor and Councillor.

List of mayors

Election results

2007 election

2016 election

2019 election

The 2019 mayoral election was run using the single transferable voting system. Previous mayoral elections had used first past the post.

Incumbent candidate

Notes

References

 Mayors of Tauranga, 1882– Tauranga City Council
 History of Tauranga and Western Bay of Plenty

Tauranga
Tauranga
Politics of the Bay of Plenty Region